Energy in Luxembourg describes energy and electricity production, consumption and import in Luxembourg. Energy policy of Luxembourg will describe the politics of Luxembourg related to energy in greater detail. Electricity sector in Luxembourg is the main article of electricity in Luxembourg.

Luxembourg is a net energy importer. Primary energy use in Luxembourg was 48 TWh in 2009, or 98 TWh per million inhabitants.

Overview 

There was no decline in the climate change gas emissions from year 2008 to 2012 in Luxembourg. There was no better efficiency in the use of electricity from 2008 to 2012.

Electricity 

In 2008, electricity use per person in Luxembourg was 2.6 times greater than in the United Kingdom.

The 1970s energy crisis led Luxembourg to briefly consider constructing a nuclear power plant. In 1972 RWE and the government negotiated a project to build a 1,200 MW nuclear reactor along the Moselle river near Remerschen. In 1974 there were already signs that there was little support for the project among public opinion. The opposition to the project grew, and became more organized, ultimately forcing the government to cancel the project at the end of 1977.

Subsequently, the construction of the large French Cattenom Nuclear Power Plant in 1979 close to the Luxembourg border caused tensions between the two countries.

Renewable energy 

Luxembourg is the EU country with the second smallest forecast penetration of renewables, with the NREAP assuming that only 12% of electricity consumption will be covered by renewables in 2020.

At the end of 2010 the installed capacity of wind power covered on average 1.1% of electricity use. This is among the lowest in Europe, with only Latvia, Czech Republic, Finland, Slovakia, Slovenia and Malta generating a smaller share of their electricity from wind power. In comparison, Ireland can generate over half of its electricity from wind power under optimal wind conditions in 2010.

Climate change

Emissions of carbon dioxide in total, per capita in 2007 were 22.4 tons CO2 compared to EU 27 average 7.9 tons .

1990 emissions were 13 Mt eqKyoto protocol target is reduction of 4 Mt (28%).

See also 

 Cegedel
 List of Ministers for Energy of Luxembourg

References